Acacia armillata is a tree of the genus Acacia and the subgenus Plurinerves that is endemic to north eastern Australia

Description
It has rough grey coloured bark toward the base of the trunk that becomes smoother and more mottled above. Like most species of Acacia it has phyllodes rather than true leaves. The evergreen, glabrous and thinly coriaceous phyllodes have a narrowly elliptic to lanceolate shape and are straight to shallowly sickle shaped.

Distribution
It has a disjunct distribution throughout far north Queensland and is found in three localities separated by great distances from each other on or near the Great Dividing Range on Cape York Peninsula. These are the area around Iron Range Mining, the area around Mount Janet and surrounding the junction of Walsh River and Price Creek where it is usually found as a part of Eucalyptus normantonensis or Eucalyptus cullenii woodland communities.

See also
 List of Acacia species

References

armillata
Acacias of Western Australia
Plants described in 1990
Taxa named by Leslie Pedley